Cieplewo is a railway station in Cieplewo, Poland.

Lines crossing the station

References 
Cieplewo article at Polish Stations Database, URL accessed at 2 March 2006

Railway stations in Pomeranian Voivodeship
Gdańsk County